The 1895 Iowa Agricultural Cyclones football team represented Iowa Agricultural College (later renamed Iowa State University) as an independent during the 1895 college football season. The Cyclones compiled a 3–4 record and outscored all opponents by a combined total of 82 to 70. Ed Mellinger was the team captain.

While Pop Warner is listed as the team's head coach, The Des Moines Register reported that he only worked with the team before the season started, and "it is believed he only saw the team play once" during the five-year period he was listed as the coach. Ira C. Brownlie, who founded the Iowa Agricultural football program in 1892, later recalled: "In 1895 the great Pop Warner came out to Ames to coach. He would remain with us from July to October 1. . . . He was at Ames for five years that way."

Between 1892 and 1913, the football team played on a field that later became the site of the university's Parks Library.

Schedule

References

Iowa Agricultural
Iowa State Cyclones football seasons
Iowa Agricultural Cyclones football